The Commonwealth of Kentucky has 29 official state emblems, as well as other designated places and events. The majority are determined by acts of the Kentucky General Assembly and recorded in Title I, Chapter 2 of the Kentucky Revised Statutes. The state's nickname – "The Bluegrass State" – is traditional, but has never been passed into law by the General Assembly. It does, however, appear on the state's license plates. Despite the nickname's popularity, the General Assembly has not designated bluegrass (or any other grass) as the official state grass.

The first symbol was the Seal of Kentucky, which was made official in 1792.  The original seal also contained the future state motto.  It served as the state's only emblem for over 130 years until the adoption of the state bird in 1926.  Enacted by law in 2010, the newest symbols of Kentucky are the state insect, the honey bee, and the state sports car, the Chevrolet Corvette.

Insignia

Species

Geology

Cultural

See also

References

General

Specific

State symbols
Kentucky
Symbols of Kentucky